Ocnaea boharti is a species of small-headed flies in the family Acroceridae.

References

Acroceridae
Diptera of North America
Insects described in 1983